Kurt Haggerty (born 8 January 1989) is a professional rugby league coach who is the assistant  coach for the Salford Red Devils in the Super League.

As a player, he played for the Bradford Bulls, Leigh Centurions, Widnes Vikings and the Barrow Raiders at club level and Ireland at international level, and was part of the Ireland squad at the 2013 Rugby League World Cup.

Background
He is the son of former St Helens player Roy Haggerty.

Playing career
Haggerty began his career at the Leigh Centurions and played in the Championship for the Leigh Centurions, Widnes Vikings, Barrow Raiders and the Bradford Bulls. He played one season in the  Super League with the Widnes Vikings, making 14 appearances.

He made his début for Ireland in 2012 and was a member of the squad for the 2013 Rugby League World Cup, making one appearance from the bench at the tournament in their defeat by Fiji.

At the end of the 2016 season Haggerty retired from playing at the age of 27 in order to take up a coaching role with Toronto Wolfpack.

Coaching career
In 2013 whilst a player for the Barrow Raiders, Haggerty was appointed head coach of leading amateur club, Pilkington Recs competing in the National Conference League in Division 3. In 2013 he led the team to  promotion to Division 2. In 2014 he repeated this success with promotion to Division 1. On 17 October 2015, the team secured their 3rd consecutive promotion, to move into the Premier Division in 2016. In February 2016 he guided the team to their first ever Challenge Cup win over professional opposition, beating London Skolars 13-0 in the Third Round. Haggerty was appointed assistant coach of the Toronto Wolfpack for their inaugural season in 2016.

On 2 June 2021, assistant coach Haggerty was made interim head coach of the Leigh Centurions after John Duffy left by mutual consent. Leigh had lost their opening eight matches at the time of his appointment.

On 23 August 2021, Leigh recorded their first victory under Haggerty in the 2021 Super League season after losing the previous 16 matches in the competition beating Salford 32-22.
Despite that, they were already relegated from Super League.  Leigh finished the season with only two wins from 22 matches.

References

External links

1989 births
Living people
Barrow Raiders players
Blackpool Panthers players
Bradford Bulls players
English people of Irish descent
English rugby league coaches
English rugby league players
Ireland national rugby league team players
Leigh Leopards coaches
Leigh Leopards players
Pilkington Recs coaches
Rugby league players from St Helens, Merseyside
Rugby league second-rows
Widnes Vikings players